Booker's bourbon is one of the small batch bourbons produced by the Jim Beam distillery, which is owned by Beam Suntory (a subsidiary of Suntory Holdings of Osaka, Japan).  Having the highest alcohol content of the brands in the Jim Beam "Small Batch Bourbon Collection", it is a cask strength bourbon. Booker's bourbon is aged between six and eight years and is bottled un-cut and without chill filtering at its natural proof between 121 and 130.6.

The brand began as bottlings of bourbon personally selected from barrels by Jim Beam's grandson, the late distiller emeritus Booker Noe. Noe originally bottled his straight-from-the-barrel bourbon as gifts to close friends and family, and launched his selections as a brand available to the general public with a very small (1,000-case) release in 1988. Each barrel of Booker's bourbon was hand-selected by Noe and was aged at the center of the rickhouse, where the company says that the temperature and humidity are the most favorable for fine bourbons.

While it is not necessary to cut the bourbon with water, a splash or two of distilled water is recommended (by Booker Noe) to unlock some of the flavor.

Roundtable Releases
Booker's Roundtable releases are selected by a panel of whiskey writers and the Master Distiller, Fred Noe.

Limited Edition Releases
In February 2014, Jim Beam announced that a limited edition Booker's 25th Anniversary Bourbon would be released. Booker's Batch 2014-01 is a blend of bourbons aged 10 years and 3 months, bottled at 130.8 proof, with a MSRP of $100. Only about 1000 cases of the special edition were released. Each bottle of Booker's 25th is topped with a special rose gold wax and is packaged in unique wooden boxes. Per Fred Noe, Booker's son and current Jim Beam Master Distiller, "These barrels were laid down in January 2003. Dad passed in February 2004, so I guess essentially you could say that these are some of the last barrels that dad produced before he passed away."

In February 2016, Jim Beam announced that a limited edition Booker's Rye would be released.  Batch 2016-LE "Big Time Batch" was released in June 2016 and was aged 13 years, 1 month, and 12 days. This Kentucky Straight Rye Whiskey was bottled at 136.2 proof and carried a MSRP of $299. A special green wax topped the bottles while a green and gold label adorned the front. The Limited Edition stickers were hand numbered.

In December 2018, Jim Beam announced that a limited edition Booker's 30th Anniversary Bourbon would be released. It is a blend of 70% 9 year old whiskey and 30% 16 year old whiskey, bottled at 125.8 proof, with a MSRP of $199. Each bottle of Booker's 30th Anniversary is topped with a special silver wax and packaged in unique boxes made of reclaimed wood from Jim Beam's post-prohibition Warehouse E. Booker's 30th Anniversary is unique in that master distiller Fred Noe made almost all of the decisions for this bottling, instead of using the Roundtable committee.

Ratings and reviews
Booker's has won some tasting accolades, including a score of 95 from Wine Enthusiast in 2014. In Fall 2014, ratings aggregator Proof66 put Booker's in the Top 90th percentile of all whiskies. In 2017, Food & Wine Magazine named Booker's #2 in its list of “The 25 Most Important Bourbons Ever Made.” 

Food critic Morgan Murphy said "The dark reddish brown liquid packs a serious punch with its high proof. But the robust, sweet, smooth flavor and cedar notes makes Booker's a favorite."

In December 2016, citing scarcity and demand, Beam Suntory announced a reduction in new batch releases and a large increase in the recommended retail price that would take effect in 2017. The price hike upset longtime fans of the brand, attracted criticism in whiskey news media and on social media. In January 2017, the company changed course and announced the price increase would instead take place over the course of several years.

References

External links
Jim Beam Small Batch Bourbon Collection official web site.
Booker's review at Boys of Bourbon
Proof66 Ratings Page for Booker's
Booker's Bourbon

Bourbon whiskey
Beam Suntory